Lucy Toulmin Smith (1838–1911) was an Anglo-American antiquarian and librarian, known for her first publication of the York Mystery Plays and other early works.

Life 
Toulmin Smith was born at Boston, Massachusetts, USA, on 21 November 1838, of English parents, Joshua Toulmin Smith and his wife Martha. She was the eldest child of a family of three daughters and two sons. In 1842 the Toulmin Smiths returned to England and settled in Highgate, Middlesex. She was educated at home, and went on to assist her father in editing his journal the Parliamentary Remembrancer (1857–65). After his death she completed his volume English Gilds, adding her own introduction.

Subsequently she edited many other important early documents, in some cases also translating from the French. She was a close friend of Mary Kingsley and helped her in her literary work. She collaborated with many scholars of all nationalities, such as James Gairdner. She also contributed to the girls' magazine Atalanta, edited by L. T. Meade, who was the wife of her brother Alfred.

In 1893 Manchester College opened new buildings in Oxford. The library housed valuable collections of books, but had no librarian, until in September 1894 Toulmin Smith was appointed. In addition to the ordinary running of the library, she took pains to build up collections of special relevance to the college's nonconformist heritage. Thus she completed James Martineau's set of the papers of the Metaphysical Society (1869–80). Likewise she built up almost complete runs of periodicals of interest to Unitarians as the annual reports of the British and Foreign Unitarian Association, and the unitarian journal The Inquirer. Meanwhile, her own scholarly work continued with numerous publications.

She died in Oxford on 18 December 1911.

Works 

 The "religious play" referred to is The Brome play of Abraham and Isaac, which LTS first published.

 (four volumes)

References 

1838 births
1911 deaths
People from Boston
English antiquarians
English librarians
British women librarians
British women historians